Malta competed at the 1960 Summer Olympics in Rome, Italy. Ten competitors, all men, took part in six events in four sports.  The nation returned to the Olympic Games after a 12-year absence, since 1948.

Cycling

Three cyclists represented Malta in 1960.

Individual road race
 Paul Camilleri
 John Bugeja
 Joseph Polidano

Team time trial
 John Bugeja
 Paul Camilleri
 Joseph Polidano

Sailing

Shooting

Two shooters represented Malta in 1960.

Trap
 Wenzu Vella
 Joseph Grech

Swimming

See also
 Malta at the 1960 Summer Paralympics

References

External links
Official Olympic Reports

Nations at the 1960 Summer Olympics
1960
1960 in Maltese sport